Carl Finch (born November 29, 1951, in Texarkana, Texas) is a guitarist, keyboard player, accordionist, vocalist, songwriter and record producer who co-founded the Grammy-winning polka/dance band Brave Combo in 1979 in Denton, Texas.

Career highlights
He co-produced the albums Equal Scary People for the singer-songwriter Sara Hickman and El Gato Negro for the conjunto musician Santiago Jimenez, Jr. He composed music for and appears as an extra in David Byrne's 1986 movie True Stories. His instrumental "Mall Music" appears on the associated album Sounds from True Stories. He co-wrote the music for the play Evelyn and the Polka King. He produced the opening for YuYu Hakusho and both the opening and ending themes for the Funimation dub of Dragon Ball and Case Closed. He appeared in animated form, along with the rest of Brave Combo, on an episode of The Simpsons in 2004. He produced and, along with Brave Combo, performed all of the music for the 2008 animated PBS television series Click and Clack's As the Wrench Turns.

Personal life
Finch is a vegetarian.

References

External links
 Brave Combo official website

1951 births
Living people
People from Texarkana, Texas
Polka musicians
Musicians from Texas
Record producers from Texas
21st-century accordionists